is a 2016 Japanese drama film directed by Miwa Nishikawa, starring Masahiro Motoki. It depicts the well-being and uncertainty of relationships through how people who suddenly lose their families restore their lives.

Plot

Sachio (Masahiro Motoki) is a noted celebrity writer from the country, who has snobbishly dismissed his background and become somewhat arrogant. He has largely fallen out of love with his wife Natsuko (Eri Fukatsu), a hairdresser. When she dies in a bus crash, he is in bed with his mistress. Despite this, he feels no guilt, which disgusts his mistress, who, already racked with guilt, leaves him.

Sachio's wife was travelling on the bus with her friend Yuki (Keiko Horiuchi), who also died in the crash. He is contacted by her husband Yoichi Omiya, a truck driver who, with his wife's death, has been left to look after two small children and is not coping. Sachio offers to help, and assists with the raising of the children. When doing it, he ponders his own lack of grief for his wife, and realises that he is dealing with his own guilt by looking after the children. Sachio is forced to reevaluate his own life, including why he didn't have children of his own.

Yoichi too finds that he had become somewhat detached from his children. When Yoichi finds a new partner, Sachio has to leave the children. He ends up writing a new book about the experience, and plays an unexpected role in the children's lives, eventually finding some closure for the loss of his wife.

Cast
 Masahiro Motoki as Sachio Kinugasa
 Eri Fukatsu as Natsuko Kinugasa
 Pistol Takehara as Yoichi Omiya
 Kenshin Fujita
 Tamaki Shiratori
 Keiko Horiuchi
 Sosuke Ikematsu
 Haru Kuroki
 Maho Yamada
 Izumi Matsuoka
 Shigeyuki Totsugi
 Hideto Iwai

Awards

References

External links
  
 

2016 films
2010s Japanese-language films
Films directed by Miwa Nishikawa
2010s Japanese films